Dendroxena is a genus of beetles in the family Silphidae.

The genus was described in 1858 by Victor Motschulsky.

The genus has cosmopolitan distribution.

Synonym: Xylodrepa Thomson, 1859.

Species:
 Dendroxena quadrimaculata (Scopoli, 1771)

References

External links

Silphidae
Beetle genera